Ud-e Taqi (also Romanized as ‘Ūd-e Taqī; also known as Shāveh-ye ‘Ūd-e Taqī) is a village in Azadeh Rural District, Moshrageh District, Ramshir County, Khuzestan Province, Iran. At the 2006 census, its population was 170, in 31 families.

References 

Populated places in Ramshir County